Shorea andulensis (also called light red meranti) is a species of tree in the family Dipterocarpaceae. It is endemic to Borneo.

Shorea andulensis is a large tree, growing up to 45 metres tall.

It grows in lowland mixed dipterocarp forests up to 400 metres elevation.

References

See also
List of Shorea species

andulensis
Endemic flora of Borneo
Trees of Borneo
Flora of the Borneo lowland rain forests
Taxonomy articles created by Polbot